is a Japanese female  track cyclist. She competed in the 500 m time trial and team sprint event at the 2011 UCI Track Cycling World Championships. She is also a professional keirin cyclist.

Major results
2013
2nd Sprint, ACC Track Asia Cup – Thailand Round
2014
3rd Keirin, Japan Track Cup 1

References

External links
 Profile at cyclingarchives.com

1984 births
Living people
Japanese female cyclists
Place of birth missing (living people)
Keirin cyclists
20th-century Japanese women
21st-century Japanese women